The 2003–04 Liga Bet season saw Hapoel Bnei Jadeidi, Hapoel Afula, Hapoel Qalansawe and Hapoel Bnei Lod win their regional divisions and promoted to Liga Alef.

At the bottom, Maccabi Bir al-Maksur (from North A division), Hapoel Bnei Nazareth (from North B division), M.M. Giv'at Shmuel and Maccabi Montefiore (from South A division) were all relegated to Liga Gimel. However, Beitar Acre (from North A division), Maccabi Daliyat al-Karmel (from North B division), Maccabi Yehud (from South A division), Maccabi Kiryat Ekron and Hapoel Oranit (from South B division), which finished in the relegation zone, were all reprieved from relegation, after several vacancies were created in Liga Bet for the 2004–05 season, mostly due to withdrawals and mergers of clubs.

North A Division

North B Division

South A Division

South B Division

References
Liga Bet North, 03-04 One 
Liga Bet North B, 03-04 One 
Liga Bet South A, 03-04  One 
Liga Bet South B, 03-04 One 

Liga Bet seasons
5
Israel